The 1978–79 season was Blackpool F.C.'s 71st season (68th consecutive) in the Football League. They competed in the 24-team Division Three, then the third tier of English football, finishing twelfth.

Bob Stokoe was installed as manager during the summer, his second stint in the role. He remained in charge for only one season, however.

Derek Spence was the club's top scorer, with seventeen goals (sixteen in the league and one in the League Cup).

Table

References

Blackpool F.C.
Blackpool F.C. seasons